Luis Felipe Monti (15 May 1901 – 9 September 1983) was an Italian Argentine footballer who played as a midfielder and an Olympian. Monti has the distinction of having played in two FIFA World Cup final matches with two different national teams. He played the first of these finals with his native Argentina in 1930, which was lost to Uruguay; and the second with Italy as one of their Oriundi in 1934, thanks to his Romagnol descent. This second time Monti was on the winning side in a 2–1 victory over Czechoslovakia.

Monti was a rugged, physical, and ruthless player, but had the technical skills to go with his stamina and strong tackling. He played as an attacking centre half in the old-fashioned Metodo system: a position roughly equivalent to the defensive central midfield position of today. As such he would mark the opposing centre forward when his team were defending, but would be the main midfield playmaker when his team were on the attack, due to his passing and creativity, which enabled him to start attacking plays after winning back the ball. He was nicknamed doble ancho (double wide) due to his coverage of the pitch. Monti is considered one of the best center-halves of his generation.

Career

Argentina

Monti started his career in 1921 with Huracán, where he won the first of his many championships. The following year he signed with Boca Juniors but left without playing a game. He joined San Lorenzo where he won a further three Argentine championships. All of Monti's honours in Argentina were recorded during the Amateur Era.

Monti was first called up to represent the Argentina national team in 1924. He won the 1927 South American Championship and the silver medal at the 1928 Summer Olympics. With Monti as a key player, Argentina cruised to the World Cup final in 1930, defeating France, Mexico, Chile, and the United States. Monti scored two goals along the way, and injured  opponents with his tackling. Some sources speculate that Monti was carrying an injury, but whatever the truth, and despite a death threat, he had a quiet game as Uruguay triumphed 4–2.

Italy
In 1930 Monti was signed by the Italian club Juventus, as he had Italian citizenship. As he was overweight and out of condition, he had a month's solitary training. Monti was back to top form helping Juventus to four consecutive Serie A titles (1932 to 1935), also serving as the club's captain. Monti went on to play 225 matches and scored 19 goals in Italy.

He was also called up, within a year, to play for the Italian national team as an oriundo. Hosts Italy won their way to the 1934 World Cup final and defeated Czechoslovakia 2–1. And he also was a part of the successful squad that won the 1933–35 Central European International Cup.

The Battle of Highbury
The Battle of Highbury is a match that took place between Italy and England on 14 November 1934 at Highbury, the home ground of Arsenal. Monti was playing centre half for Italy, but as early as the second minute he broke a bone in his foot after a clash with England centre forward Ted Drake. Down to 10 men, in the days before substitutes, Italy succumbed 2–3. Monti was only to play twice more for Italy.

In total Monti won 16 caps (5 goals) for Argentina between 1924 and 1931, and 18 caps (1 goal) for Italy between 1932 and 1936.

After football
Monti became manager after retiring. In 1947, he managed the first team of Huracán. He died in 1983 aged 82.

International goals

Argentina's goal tally first

Italia's goal tally first

Honours

Player 
Club

Huracán
 Argentine Primera División (1): 1921

San Lorenzo
 Argentine Primera División (3): 1923, 1924, 1927

Juventus
 Serie A (4): 1931–32, 1932–33, 1933–34, 1934–35
 Coppa Italia (1): 1937–38

International
Argentina
 South American Football Championship: 1927
 Summer Olympics: Runner-up 1928
 FIFA World Cup: Runner-up 1930

Italy
 FIFA World Cup: 1934
 Central European International Cup: 1933–35

Individual
 FIFA World Cup All-Star Team (2): 1930, 1934

Manager 
Club

Juventus
 Coppa Italia (1): 1941–42

References

External links

 Detail of international appearances for Argentina and Italy, by RSSSF
 Biography at Planet World Cup
  
 Short bio at La Gazzetta dello Sport 

1901 births
1930 FIFA World Cup players
1983 deaths
Footballers from Buenos Aires
Argentine people of Italian descent
Italian people of Argentine descent
Citizens of Italy through descent
Argentine footballers
Argentina international footballers
Argentine expatriate footballers
Argentine expatriate sportspeople in Italy
Italy international footballers
Olympic footballers of Argentina
Footballers at the 1928 Summer Olympics
Olympic silver medalists for Argentina
1934 FIFA World Cup players
FIFA World Cup-winning players
Club Atlético Huracán footballers
San Lorenzo de Almagro footballers
Juventus F.C. players
Serie A players
Argentine Primera División players
Expatriate footballers in Argentina
Expatriate footballers in Italy
Dual internationalists (football)
Italian football managers
Argentine football managers
Italian expatriate football managers
Argentine expatriate football managers
Club Atlético Huracán managers
Atalanta B.C. managers
Olympic medalists in football
People of Romagnol descent
Medalists at the 1928 Summer Olympics
Association football midfielders
Italian footballers
Vigevano Calcio managers